Vedigundu Murugesan is a 2009 Tamil-language comedy film directed by A. Govindamoorthy. It stars Pasupathy, Jyothirmayi and Deepa Shankar. The music was composed by Dhina. The film released on 17 July 2009 and received positive reviews for Vadivelu's superb comedy in this film.

Plot
The movie is set in the village of Kizhrajakularaman in Rajapalayam Taluka. Vedigundu Murugesan (Pasupathy) is a small-time guy who breaks the law occasionally but is a Good Samaritan in the eyes of the local judge (Nirmala Perisamy) as he provides shelter and looks after a mentally challenged girl named Ponni (Deepa Shankar), who was deserted by her parents.

Parallel narration is the comedy track of Alert Aarumugam (Vadivelu), a petty and clever thief.

Murugesan earns his living fetching water for factories and hotels in his village. A lady constable named Nachiyar (Jyothirmayi), who rubs Murugesan the wrong way, falls in love with him due to his humanitarian nature and the will to help others. Soon, Ponni is raped by one of the baddies, leading to the final climax in the hospital.

Cast
 Pasupathy as Murugesan
 Jyothirmayi as Constable Nachiyar
 Vadivelu as Alert Aarumugam
 Thyagu as "Kandhu Vatti" Kanthan
 Deepa Shankar as Ponni
 Nirmala Periyasamy as Judge
 Raneesh as Kodanchan
 Veera as Ganesh
 Karnaa Radha

Soundtrack
Music was composed by Dhina.

Critical reception
Rediff wrote:"Despite its many failings and loop-holes, Vedigundu Murugesan does work at times chiefly because the climax and screenplay try to rise above the ordinary". Indiaglitz wrote:"There's a certain deftness that you need to have, to handle both comedy and sentiment in the same vein. Moorthy, whose 'Vedigundu Murugesan' has just released, definitely displays that".  Behindwoods wrote:"there is nothing much to rave about the story and ditto with the performances and the direction. Awful dialogues, in the guise of comedy only tests your patience further as you are busy stifling yawns".

References

2009 films
2000s Tamil-language films
Films directed by A. Govindamoorthy